The Arado L I was a two-seat parasol-wing sport monoplane built in Germany in 1929, in order to compete in the Europa Rundflug that year. During the fuel consumption trials, the L 1 made a forced landing and was disqualified from the contest. Bringing the aircraft back to Paris, designer Hermann Hofmann performed some aerobatics over the airfield and was killed when it crashed.

Specifications

References
 
 World Aircraft Information Files. Brightstar Publishing, London. File 889 Sheet 73
 German Aircraft between 1919 – 1945

1920s German sport aircraft
L I
Parasol-wing aircraft
Aircraft first flown in 1929